Bearded Theory's Spring Gathering, also known as Bearded Theory, is an independent music festival which has no sponsorship or branding that takes place every May on the South Derbyshire, West Midland and Staffordshire border in the National Forest in Britain. The festival is organised by Bearded Theory and was first held in 2008. The festival has nine stages which are the large supernova type Main Stage (similar to the Park or Other Stage at Glastonbury), The Pallet, The Woodland, Magical Sounds, Showcase Stage (introducing stage) The Maui Waui Stage, The Ship, Convoy Cabaret, Something Else Stage, Rogues Hideout and the festival also hosts a Cinema, Craft Village, Healing Area, smaller DJ venues, several public real ale bars, several cocktail or gin bars, Festival School, Children's Village and a Victorian Funfair. The festival has several campsites and campervan fields, multiple arena areas and are all spread over 250 acres at Catton Park.

On 20 March 2020, it was announced that due to the COVID-19 Pandemic, the 2020 Spring Festival would be postponed to 10–13 September.

History

Bearded Theory began life at the Knockerdown Public House, near Carsington Water in 2008. Held over two nights and it overloaded the capacity of the venue.  Opening with two acoustic acts (one of whom was also the festival compere known as 'Freedom') the first full band to play the festival were Nottingham rock band Felicity Kicks.  Other bands to play included 3 Daft Monkeys, Dreadzone, Tarantism & Hobo Jones & the Junkyard Dogs.

In 2009, the festival was held at 30-acre Bradley Nook Farm in Hulland Ward. The new look festival hosted 4 stages; the Main Stage, Campfire Stage (the stage structure was used in 2015 as the Woodland Stage), the introduction of the Magical Sounds, a large dance big top and remains a key part of the festival and a reggae sound system. During the festival a tornado tore through the festival site, uprooting stalls, tents, and the Main stage and also did damage to the second stage. The situation put the festival in the news headlines. The organisers continued the festival and an alternative stage was erected in the bar and the festival continued, with music from Goldblade, The Saw Doctors and Hawkwind, and others.

The 2010 festival was substantially larger, selling out and filling the 30 acres available, and by 2011, a new site had to be found. The organisers arranged with the National Trust for the festival to be held at Kedleston Park within Kedleston Hall in Derby,  an 80-acre parkland. In 2011 Bearded Theory won UK's Best Independent Festival at the AIM Music Awards.

By 2012 the crowd of festival goers had grown, by now over 600 acts had played at the festival, including King Blues, The Wonder Stuff, New Model Army, The Waterboys, Athlete, The Orb, Wheatus, Adam Ant and the Damned. During 2012 the organizers spent time delivering stage safety seminars to European events industry at Primavera Sound in Barcelona and various industry conferences in London following the successful implementation of a comprehensive stage safety policy at the festival.

The 2013 line-up included, with The Levellers, Reverend & Makers, Asian Dub Foundation, New Model Army, A Guy Called Gerald, The Farm, Maroon Town, The Destroyers, The Jive Aces and Gallon Drunk across six stages.  There was also an "Unsigned Bands Contest". Bearded Theory won Best Small Festival at the UK Festival Awards.

In 2014, the festival had to move once again after citing issues with landowner the National Trust following draconian measures being implemented and lack of contractual security.  The festival decided to locate to the independently owned 250-acre estate Catton Park in South Derbyshire, a venue the organizers had looked at before deciding to locate to Kedleston Hall. Bearded Theory attracted a capacity crowd. Performing bands included Carter USM, UB40, Stranglers, Peter Hook, Wonderstuff, Pop Will Eat Itself, Reverend & the Makers. The festival's organizers won the Promoter of the Year award at the UK Festival Awards for their industry work with stage safety. In 2015 the festival agreed to a 5-year contract to remain at Catton Hall and implemented substantial land improvements including access roads, installing a permanent water supply and drainage.

Bands that appeared included The Mission, James, Afro Celt Sound System, Lab 4, Cara Dillon, Neville Staple, Alabama 3, Gun, Hugh Cornwell, British Sea Power, Buzzcocks, Misty in Roots and The Bar-Steward Sons of Val Doonican. The festival sold out and was cited as the organizers best festival to date. The festival made history when they announced the plans to operate an onsite school on the Friday of the festival. The school met key learning criteria at each age level and classes included Science, Home Economics, Math's, English, History and lots more. The P.E classes were operated by Derby County FC. The school assisted parents taking children out of school without being fined and was a festival first.

In 2016 the festival sold out and produced a universally well received festival. The festival went onto win Best Family Festival at the UK Festival Awards and gig of the year for the performance by Wilko Johnson in Stand Out Magazine. Bands who performed included Killing Joke, Squeeze, Jack Savoretti, Levellers, The Jam, Black Uhuru and Stiff Little Fingers.

2017 featured over 150 bands and DJ's with Madness, Skunk Anansie, The Fall, Seasick Steve, Vintage Trouble, CJ Bolland, Foy Vance, Sugarhill Gang. The festival sold out a month in advance and received various good reviews from Festivals for All, BBC 6 Music, Radio 2, Efestivals, Gourmet Gigs, Louder than War Magazine, The Guardian, The Independent and Festival Kidz.

Bearded Theory has won 7 awards. 2016 UK's Best Family Festival, 2014 Promoter of the Year at the UK Festival Awards and Silver Award Festival Kidz Awards, 2013 UK's Best Small Festival at the UK Festival Awards and Gold Award at the Festival Kidz Awards. In 2011 UK's Best Independent Festival at the AIM Awards.

References

External links
 

Music festivals in Derbyshire